Janne Johannes Saarinen (born 28 February 1977, in Espoo) is a retired Finnish footballer.

Career
Saarinen started his career as a promising attacking midfielder at HJK Helsinki, making his Veikkausliiga debut in 1993. In 1997, he moved to Swedish giants IFK Göteborg, but never made a breakthrough – partly because of injuries. After two years he returned to HJK, where he was converted to a left back by the then coach Jyrki Heliskoski. He impressed in his new position, earning a move to Norwegian giants Rosenborg in 2001. In 2003, Saarinen moved to 1860 Munich of the German Bundesliga, but he was not successful there, and moved to Danish giants FC København in 2004. Saarinen returned to Finland with home-town club FC Honka for the 2006 season, stating he wanted to play in a more attacking role once more. In 2008 Saarinen joined Häcken from Sweden, where he played for two years. On 11 September 2009, Saarinen went back to HJK Helsinki.

International career
Saarinen made his debut for the Finnish national team on 16 August 2000 against Norway. He was Finland's first choice left back for most of the first half of the 2000s.

Statistics

Honours
HJK Helsinki
Finnish Cup: 1993, 1996, 2000
Veikkausliiga: 2010

Rosenborg
Tippeligaen: 2001, 2002, 2003

FC Copenhagen
Royal League: 2004–05
Danish Superliga: 2005–06

References

External links
 
 

1977 births
Living people
Footballers from Espoo
Finnish footballers
Finnish expatriate footballers
Association football fullbacks
Association football midfielders
Helsingin Jalkapalloklubi players
IFK Göteborg players
Rosenborg BK players
TSV 1860 Munich players
F.C. Copenhagen players
FC Honka players
BK Häcken players
Finland international footballers
Expatriate footballers in Germany
Finnish expatriate sportspeople in Germany
Expatriate footballers in Norway
Finnish expatriate sportspeople in Norway
Expatriate footballers in Sweden
Finnish expatriate sportspeople in Sweden
Expatriate men's footballers in Denmark
Finnish expatriate sportspeople in Denmark
Veikkausliiga players
Eliteserien players
Bundesliga players
Allsvenskan players
Danish Superliga players